David McClure may refer to:     
 David McClure (footballer), Scottish professional footballer
 David McClure (artist) (1926–1998), Scottish artist
 Dave McClure, American entrepreneur
 David McClure (basketball), American basketball coach and former player

See also 
 David Brinkley (David McClure Brinkley, 1920–2003), American broadcaster